Shaka's Rock is a town on the North Coast of KwaZulu-Natal, South Africa.

Shaka's Rock is a small residential village  from Durban. Its name comes from a promontory over which the Zulu chief Shaka is said to have thrown his enemies and to have tested his men by daring them to jump to their deaths.

Shaka's Rock is a popular holiday destination, situated between Salt Rock and Ballito on the Dolphin Coast. Shaka's Rock Beach Tidal Pool is protected and well known for snorkelling, with a wide variety of fish, corals and other sealife.

Infrastructure

Roads 

Shaka’s Rock has access to one main highway, the N2 ‘North Coast Toll Road’ which bypasses the seaside village to the west and links it to KwaDukuza in the north and Durban in the south-west. Access to Shaka’s Rock from the N2 can be obtained through the Shaka’s Rock Road interchange (Exit 212) or alternatively the Ballito interchange (Exit 210). 

‘Shaka’s Rock Road’ is a small secondary road which starts from the intersection with Ocean Drive and runs in a northwesterly direction towards Simbithi Eco Estate, the N2 interchange, Shaka’s Head and the R102 (to oThongathi and KwaDukuza)

‘Ocean Drive’ is the main road through Shaka’s Rock and runs along the coast from Ballito in the south to Salt Rock in the north.

References

Populated places in the KwaDukuza Local Municipality